Automóvil Club Comodorio Rivadavia  is a  motorsports circuit located in Comodoro Rivadavia, Patagonian, Argentina.  It has hosted events in the TC2000 series,  Top Race V6 and Turismo Carretera.

The circuit is the second southernmost FIA-recognized racetrack in the world, beaten only by Teretonga Park in New Zealand.

Lap records 

The fastest official race lap records at the Autódromo General San Martín (Comodoro Rivadavia) are listed as:

References

Autódromo General San Martín